The 1929 Staten Island Stapletons season was their inaugural season in the league. The team finished 3–4–3 and finished sixth in the league.

Schedule

Standings

References

Staten Island Stapletons seasons
Staten Island Stapletons